Buti-ye Pain (also Romanized as Būtī-ye Pā’īn; also known as Būtī-ye Nūr Moḩammad) is a village in Polan Rural District, Polan District, Chabahar County, Sistan and Baluchestan Province, Iran. At the 2006 census, its population was 167, in 32 families.

References 

Populated places in Chabahar County